Antonio Martino (22 December 1942 – 5 March 2022) was an Italian politician, who was the minister of foreign affairs in 1994 and minister of defense from 2001 to 2006. He was a founding member of Forza Italia.

Life and career
Born in Messina, he was the son of Gaetano Martino (1900–1967), the Foreign Minister of Italy from 1954 to 1957 and prominent member of the Italian Liberal Party (PLI).

Martino earned a J.D. in Jurisprudence from the University of Messina Law School in 1964, then went on to the University of Chicago for postgraduate studies in Economics from 1966 to 1968, where he was a student of Milton Friedman. After graduation he started his career as Visiting Professor at the Rome Center of Loyola University Chicago. After becoming a professor in 1976 Martino worked at the University of Messina, University of Bari, University of Naples and Sapienza University of Rome.

A member of the Italian Parliament, he was first elected in 1994 and then re-elected in 1996 and 2001. He ran for PLI secretary in the mid-1980s but was unsuccessful.

From 1992, Martino was a professor of economics in the political science department at the LUISS University of Rome. Since 1978 he was the Adjunct Scholar at The Heritage Foundation and an editorial board member of the Cato Journal from 1990. He wrote 11 books and over 150 papers and articles in the fields of economic theory and policy. He was a regular contributor to a variety of Italian and foreign periodicals and newspapers as well as Italian and international television and radio programmes. He worked as an editorial writer for a number of Italian newspapers (La Stampa, Il Sole 24 Ore, Mondo economico, L'Opinione, Il Giornale, Quotidiano Nazionale Nazione-Giorno-Carlino), and his bi-line has appeared in international publications such as The Wall Street Journal, The Times, Le Figaro, Neue Zürcher Zeitung, The American Spectator, Economic Affairs, and others.

In 1988–1990, Martino was President of the Mont Pelerin Society. During the 1990's, he wrote a book in Italian, Stato Padrone, in which he set out his free-market ideas.

He was one of the founders of Forza Italia. He was the minister of Foreign Affairs in the first cabinet of Prime Minister Silvio Berlusconi (1994–95) and the minister of Defense when Berlusconi returned to power (2001–2006). Martino was very close to Michael Ledeen.

In 2004 he was the main promoter for the suspending compulsory military service, formally decided already in 2001, but which was to begin in 2007: consequently  the suspension came into effect indefinitely on 1 January 2005 (Martino Law), and furthermore granted exemption to all those who had in the past obtained postponements of service on grounds such as study. Additionally, he backed  the a speedier transformation of the armed forces into a body of professional volunteers.

Martino was also the Secretary of the Italy-USA Foundation's Scientific Committee. In 2005, he was awarded the Medal for Distinguished Public Service by the United States Department of Defense.

Martino was married and had two daughters. He died in Rome on 5 March 2022, at the age of 79.

References

Further reading
 A. Martino, Stato Padrone, Sperling&Kupfer, Milan 1997.

External links
 Antonio Martino bio at History Commons 

|-

1942 births
2022 deaths
20th-century Italian politicians
21st-century Italian politicians
Foreign ministers of Italy
Forza Italia politicians
Italian economists
Journalists from Sicily
Italian male journalists
Italian Liberal Party politicians
Deputies of Legislature XII of Italy
Deputies of Legislature XIII of Italy
Deputies of Legislature XIV of Italy
Deputies of Legislature XV of Italy
Deputies of Legislature XVI of Italy
Deputies of Legislature XVII of Italy
Italian Ministers of Defence
Politicians from Messina
Propaganda Due
The People of Freedom politicians
Member of the Mont Pelerin Society